Fridolin Heer (July 30, 1834 – September 19, 1910) was a Swiss-born and trained architect who immigrated to the United States in 1864 and set up a practice in Dubuque, Iowa shortly thereafter. He was joined in his practice by his son, Fridolin Heer Jr.

Fridolin Heer Jr. studied architecture in Germany and worked in Chicago in the offices of Adler and Sullivan before returning to Dubuque to work with his father.

Heer died at his home in Dubuque in 1910.

Works
Buildings by Fridolin Heer and his son include:

Andrew-Ryan House, Dubuque (1873)
Town Clock Building, Dubuque (1873)
Corpus Christi Catholic Church, Fort Dodge, Iowa (1882)
St. Boniface Catholic Church, Westphalia, Iowa (1882)
Blessed Sacrament Chapel at St. Raphael's Cathedral, Dubuque (1882)
St. Lawrence Catholic Church, Otter Creek Township, Jackson County, Iowa (1883)
Sacred Heart Catholic Church, Dubuque (1888)
Basilica of St. Francis Xavier, Dyersville, Iowa (1889)
Dubuque County Courthouse, Dubuque (1893)
Security Building, Dubuque (1896)
Jacob Regez, Sr. House, Monroe, Wisconsin (1901)

Notes

References 
 Gebhard, David and Gerald Mansheim, Buildings of Iowa, Oxford University Press, New York,  1993

External links 
Dubuque County Courthouse website

1834 births
1910 deaths
Swiss architects
People from Dubuque, Iowa
Swiss emigrants to the United States